Phalaenopsis pulchra is an endemic species of orchid from the Philippines.

External links 
 
 

pulchra
Orchids of the Philippines
Plants described in 1875